David McDonnell (born 11 October 1971) is an Irish former professional snooker player.

Career

Born in 1971, McDonnell turned professional in 1991. His first season saw a run to the last 32 at the 1991 UK Championship, where he defeated Geet Sethi, Kieran McAlinden, John Harrop, Francois Ellis, John Spencer and John Campbell before playing South African Silvino Francisco in his last-64 match. Having whitewashed Spencer, the three-time World Champion, 6–0 in what was one of Spencer's final matches, McDonnell trailed Francisco 1–5, but overcame him 9–8. He next faced incumbent World Champion John Parrott but, having held him to 2–2, lost 4–9.

The following season brought another last-32 finish, this time at the 1992 Dubai Classic; McDonnell beat four opponents, including Colin Roscoe and Peter Francisco, en route to a 3–5 loss to Gary Wilkinson. A year later, he reached the last 64 at the 1993 UK Championship - against Jimmy White, McDonnell went 0–6 behind, but after recovering to 5–6, subsequently lost 6–9.

The next three seasons were poor, and McDonnell fell off the tour in 1997. Forced to re-qualify, his performances in the qualifying events in 1997/1998 were sufficient to achieve this, and McDonnell competed again as a professional for another four years. The highlight of this time was a run to the last 16 at the 2001 Scottish Open - a career-best finish - where he defeated Scott MacKenzie, Craig MacGillivray, Jonathan Birch, Mike Dunn, Terry Murphy and most notably Stephen Lee, but lost 2–5 to Paul Hunter.

After winning only four matches during the 2001/2002 season, McDonnell again dropped off the tour at its conclusion. A semi-final finish in one event in the 2002/2003 season, where he lost to James Leadbetter, was not enough for him to re-qualify, but the following season saw a run to the quarter-final of another, losing 4–5 to Lee Spick.

The latter performance earned McDonnell the chance to compete as an amateur in 2004/2005, and he reached the last 64 at the 2005 UK Championship, losing 2–9 to Ryan Day, and the 2005 Malta Cup, where Mark Davis beat him 5–4.

Of the 13 tournaments held during 2005/2006, McDonnell entered only six; he lost all six of his matches, the last a 3–10 defeat to Tom Ford in qualifying for the 2006 World Championship, and finished the season ranked 86th. He was relegated from the tour thereafter, and left the competitive game, aged 34.

References

Irish snooker players
1971 births
Living people